The Mapúa Cardinals basketball program represents Mapúa University (MU) in men's basketball as a member of the National Collegiate Athletic Association (Philippines) (NCAA). The Mapúa Cardinals are one of the three NCAA seniors' basketball teams in Intramuros.

History 
Originally as the Mapúa Institute of Technology (MIT), the Cardinals are named after the Major League Baseball team St. Louis Cardinals. The Cardinals have won six NCAA titles, the first in 1949, and the latest in 1991. Atoy Co won the NCAA MVP award in 1971, and would later coach the team in the 21st century. Freddie Hubalde won the NCAA MVP award in 1973, and will be team mate of Co in the grand-slam winning 1983 Crispa Redmanizers team. Alvin Patrimonio then played for the Cardinals from 1983 to 1986, becoming NCAA MVP in his final two seasons with MIT.

In 1991, the Cardinals coached by Joel Banal won its last title off a go-ahead shot by Benny Cheng against the San Beda Red Lions.

Final Four era 
In 2001, Mapua qualified to its first playoff appearance in the Final Four era. They took the eventual champions San Sebastian Stags to a second game before being eliminated. Two years later, they were eliminated in the semifinals against Letran. Starting in 2005, Kelvin dela Peña led the Cardinals to four straight semifinals appearances, losing to defending champions PCU in 2005 and to San Beda in the next three years. Dela Peña was named Rookie of the Year in 2005, and Most Valuable Player (MVP) in 2007.

The Cardinals would not make it to the playoffs until 2015 when Nigerian Allwell Oraeme led them to the semifinals. Named Rookie of the Year, MVP, and three other awards, he and coach Atoy Co ended two seasons of being in last place to qualify to the semifinals, where they were beaten by Letran. Oraeme had another banner year in 2016, winning the MVP award and Defensive Player of the Year. The Cardinals lost to the Arellano Chiefs in the semifinals. Preparing for the 2017 season, Co revealed that Oraeme left school, saying he was not happy at Mapua and intends to go back to Nigeria. The Cardinals finished outside the playoff places in the next two seasons, and Mapua let go Co after the 2018 campaign.

Randy Alcantara, coach of the successful Malayan Red Robins (their high school team), was then named coach of the seniors team.

In the 2021 season (held in early 2022), the Cardinals qualified to its first Finals appearance since 1995. They lost to the defending champions Letran Knights.

Current roster
NCAA Season 98

Rivalries 
Mapua plays the Battle of Intramuros, so named after the Manila district, with the Letran Knights.

Head coaches 

 Until 1978: Valerio Lopez
 1978-1982: Charlie Badion
 1983-1984: De Jesus
 1985-1987: Art Trajano
 1987–1997: Joel Banal
 1997–1998: Bong Ramos
 2005–2006: Horacio Lim
 2007–2008: Leo Isaac
 2009–2011: Chito Victolero
 2012–2018: Atoy Co
 2019–present: Randy Alcantara

Season-by-season records

References 

National Collegiate Athletic Association (Philippines) basketball teams